Jayavarman IX, also known as Jayavarmadiparamesvara was sovereign of the Khmer Empire from 1327 to 1336.

Jayavarman IX was like his father, Indrajayavarman, a convinced Shivaite. According to the Cambodian Royal Chronicle, which named him "Sihanouk,"  he was assassinated in 1336 by the head of the royal gardens Trasak Paem, who married his daughter and took his place on the throne. This narrative is probably legendary (we find a very similar one in Burmese history: see Nyaung-U Sawrahan).

This sovereign is the last king mentioned by inscriptions on the monuments. The last Sanskrit inscription of Cambodia dates from the reign of Jayavarman Parameshwara.

References

 A Study report of Ankor Vat

1336 deaths
Khmer Empire
14th-century Cambodian monarchs